Carmiesha Cox (born 16 May 1995) is a Bahamian sprinter and hurdler who attended Purdue University. She was part of a gold medal winning Bahamian team at the 2011 Pan American Junior Athletics Championships. She ran the third leg of the 4x400 metres Relay at the 2016 Olympic Games.

References

External links
 World Athletics
 Purdue

Bahamian female hurdlers
Bahamian female sprinters
1995 births
Purdue University alumni
Living people
Sportspeople from Nassau, Bahamas
Olympic athletes of the Bahamas
Athletes (track and field) at the 2016 Summer Olympics
Athletes (track and field) at the 2015 Pan American Games
Pan American Games competitors for the Bahamas